Drona is a 2008 Indian Hindi-language superhero film directed by Goldie Behl, starring Abhishek Bachchan, Priyanka Chopra, Kay Kay Menon and Jaya Bachchan. Drona'''s special effects shots were worked on by EyeQube, headed by Charles Darby and David Bush. The movie features Indian martial arts such as Kalaripayattu, Chhau, Gatka, and sword fighting. It was filmed in Prague, Bikaner, Maharashtra, Rajasthan, and Namibia. 

Made on a budget of ₹45 crore, the film earned less than ₹15 crore and was a disaster at the box office.

Cast
 Abhishek Bachchan as Aditya 'Adi' (Drona)
 Priyanka Chopra as Sonia
 Kay Kay Menon as Riz Raizada
 Jaya Bachchan as Queen Jayanti
 Ali Haji as Young Drona
 Conan Stevens as Demon

Production
Mainly, the team collaborated with EyeQube Studios with Eros to achieve quality effects. The crew contained 250 visual effects artists, animators, designers, painters and developers.

Reception
Sukanya Verma of Rediff gave the movie 2.5 stars and mentioned, "Considering its fantastical theme, Drona is officially escapist and hence isn't obligated to broadcast logic beyond conveying 'good wins over evil' and 'conquer your fear by facing it' message." The film became the biggest disaster of Abhishek's career. Hindustan Times writes Like it or not, Drona is artless, arrogant, brazenly derivative and terribly acted by one and all (except for that puckish dwarf maybe)''.

Soundtrack

References

External links
 
 

2008 films
2000s Hindi-language films
2000s fantasy action films
2000s Indian superhero films
Indian fantasy action films
Film superheroes
Films shot in Namibia
Films shot in the Czech Republic
Rose Audio Visuals
Films shot in Prague
Indian superhero films